WNL is a broadcasting association which produces radio and television programmes within the framework of the Dutch public broadcasting system NPO. It was founded on 16 February 2009 as a right-wing conservative counterweight to a perceived leftist bias in Dutch public broadcasting, and its first programme was transmitted on 6 September 2010. Both WNL and PowNed have links to the media company Mediahuis Nederland (formerly Telegraaf Media Groep).

The name was originally an abbreviation of Wakker Nederland ("Netherlands Awake"), but the association now officially refers to itself as simply WNL – although it says that this may be taken to represent Wij Nederland ("We, Netherlands").

On television, WNL presents the breakfast-time show Goedemorgen Nederland ("Good Morning, Netherlands") on NPO 1 each weekday morning between 7.10 and 9.00 (with breaks for news bulletins from the NOS at 7.30, 8.00, and 8.30). Other WNL programmes on Nederland 1 include WNL op Zondag (a Sunday morning chat-show dealing with politics, business, media, and culture) and Allemaal Familie, a documentary series looking at the people behind a number of family firms. For NPO 2, WNL produces WNL Opiniemakers, in which invited guests discuss the week's news, and Haagse Lobby reporting on the interactions between politicians and lobbyists.

WNL also produces radio versions of WNL Opiniemakers and Haagse Lobby, as well as WNL op Zaterdag, a 2-hour long Saturday afternoon talk programme with the same brief as the similarly named television show. These programmes are all broadcast on the news, sport, and current affairs channel NPO Radio 1. Additionally, WNL broadcasts for 10 hours a week on the largely classic-hits-based NPO Radio 2.

References

External links
 Official website 

Dutch-language television networks
Dutch public broadcasting organisations
Netherlands Public Broadcasting
Radio stations in the Netherlands
Television channels and stations established in 2009
Dutch companies established in 2009